Galapa is a municipality and town in the Colombian department of Atlántico.

Galapa forms the southwestern part of the Metropolitan area of Barranquilla.

References

External links
 Gobernacion del Atlantico - Galapa
 Galapa official website

Municipalities of Atlántico Department